Melvin, Son of Alvin is a 1984 Australian comedy film. It is a sequel to Alvin Purple, but was released in the United States and the United Kingdom under the title Foreplay.

Plot
Dee Tanner, a television reporter, is doing an article on the sexiest man on Earth. She tracks down Alvin Purple and discovers he has a son, Melvin, who is similarly irresistible to women. However, Melvin is scared of women, and is a virgin.

Melvin begins a relationship with a young Greek-Australian girl, Gloria, whose mother is very protective of her. The television reporter reunites Melvin with his father, who is performing as a nightclub singer and is the leader of a cult called the 'Purple People'.

Cast
 Gerry Sont as Melvin Purple
 Graeme Blundell as Alvin Purple
 Tina Bursill as Dee Tanner
 Steve Bastoni as Bullo
 Irene Papas as Mrs Hasim
 Katy Manning as Estelle
 Rhonda Burchmore as Phillipa
 David Argue as Cameraman

Production
Production of the film was twice delayed when major backers pulled out prior to the filming date. Before the film's release, three cuts were ordered to enable the movie to get an M rating.

Reception
Filmink magazine later said "the success of T&A American comedies in the early 80s seems to have inspired this late sequel, which took the one joke concept (homely man is irresistible to women) and made it a no-joke concept by making it about a handsome male model type who is irresistible to women, replacing that with various Porky's-era tropes".

References

External links
 Melvin, Son of Alvin at IMDb
 Melvin, Son of Alvin at Oz Movies

1984 films
Australian comedy films
Australian sequel films
1980s English-language films
1980s Australian films